Ernst Christian Einar Ludvig Detlev, Graf zu Reventlow (18 August 1869 – 21 November 1943) was a German naval officer, journalist and Nazi politician.

Early life

Ernst Christian Einar Ludvig Detlev, Graf (Count) zu Reventlow was born at Husum, Schleswig-Holstein, the son of Ludvig Christian Detlev Frederik, Graf zu Reventlow (6 January 1824 - 14 June 1893), a Danish nobleman, and Emilie Julie Anna Louise Rantzau (19 April 1834 - 19 November 1905).  His younger sister was Fanny zu Reventlow (1871-1918), the "Bohemian Countess" of Schwabing. Reventlow embarked upon a career in the German Imperial Navy, reaching the rank of lieutenant commander, before his marriage to a Frenchwoman, Marie-Gabrielle-Blanche d'Allemont [de Broutillot] (19 September 1873 - 15 April 1937), forced him to resign his commission. Reventlow married Blanche on 14 March 1895 in Altona, Hamburg, Germany. He became a free-lance writer on naval issues, and later general politics.

First World War

During the First World War, Reventlow was an editorial writer on the Deutsche Tageszeitung and advocated extreme ruthlessness, particularly in submarine warfare. He accused United States Ambassador James W. Gerard of being a British spy, but assailed Zimmermann for the plot to form an alliance between Mexico and Japan against the United States. He furiously attacked Germany's leaders for yielding to the United States' demands for respect of its rights after the sinking of the Lusitania, and the Tageszeitung was suspended on 25 June 1915. In 1916, for an attack on Chancellor Bethmann Hollweg, accusing him of misleading Hindenburg, Reventlow was sued for defamation.

Reventlow was highly critical of the policies of Kaiser Wilhelm II and later of the Weimar Republic.  In 1920 he founded his own newspaper, Der Reichswart (“Guardian of the Realm”), which was published until his death.

National Bolshevik period

In the immediate post-War period, a National Bolshevik idea came from Comintern agent Karl Radek, postulating that a community of interests existed between German nationalists and the isolated Bolshevik regime in Russia.  At first, Reventlow denounced the “delusion of the so-called National Bolsheviks that Communism could turn towards nationalism,” but when Radek seized the occasion of the Ruhr occupation to deliver his Schlageter Oration before the Enlarged Executive Committee of the Comintern in 1923, Reventlow responded with sympathetic articles in  Der Reichswart that were subsequently re-printed in the communist central organ Rote Fahne.  Later, he was to write approvingly of the Communist Party of Germany’s domestic policies in the Deutsches Tageblatt and to demand fifty-percent managerial control of any enterprise by the workers.  It is reported that Reventlow alone among the Nazi leaders was never booed when addressing crowds of workers.

DVFP and NSDAP involvement
In 1924 Reventlow and Albrecht von Graefe broke from the German National People's Party (DNVP) to form the German Völkisch Freedom Party (DVFP) which was both more Völkish and left-wing than the conservative DNVP.  Both men were elected to the Reichstag as DNVP deputies, though in May 1927 Reventlow quarreled with the more conservative Graefe and left the party to join the NSDAP (Nazi Party), bringing over his faction en bloc, including Bernhard Rust, Franz Stöhr, and Wilhelm Kube, each of whom were to enjoy prominent roles in the Nazi Party.  This greatly improved the NSDAP position in northern Germany, where the DVFP had always been stronger than the NSDAP, and by the end of 1928 the DVFP had for all intents and purposes ceased to exist.

Reventlow’s group quickly allied itself with the more socialistic wing of the NSDAP headed by Gregor Strasser which favored genuine socialistic measures and an alliance with the Soviets against the western democracies.  Though a power in the party to the end, this group became less influential as Hitler turned to overt militarism and antisemitism after attaining power.

Reventlow was never liked or trusted by Hitler, but his personal popularity was substantial and Hitler chose not to cross him but to ignore him.  Reventlow was never given a high party office nor, after the seizure of power, was he given any government post.  Though often critical of government policies, he was allowed to publish his newspaper, Der Reichswart, until his death in 1943.

Antisemitism
Reventlow supported a theory first proposed by Lesley Fry (pen-name of Paquita de Shishmareff ) (1882-1970), who in her book Waters Flowing Eastward (Paris: Éditions R.I.S.S., 1931) claimed that the Protocols of the Elders of Zion were the master plan of a conspiracy according to which a group led by "cultural Zionist" Asher Ginzberg plotted world domination. However, at the time, Ginzberg supported an international Jewish cultural and political revival, rather than a single Jewish state. Reventlow named Fry as his source for his own thinking on the origins of the Protocols. After Philip Graves provided evidence in The Times that the Protocols were plagiarised forgery, Reventlow published his support for Fry's theory of Ginzberg's authorship in the periodical La Vieille France. Ginzberg's supporters sued Reventlow, who was forced to retract and pay damages. However he continued to propagate his views.

Religious activism
Reventlow’s antisemitism was never racial, as was Hitler’s, but cultural, and this led to his involvement with the German Faith Movement.  From 1934 to 1936, Reventlow served as deputy chairman of this religious movement which postulated that every people “through its blood” developed its own religious knowledge.  The movement was anti-Christian and tried to create a “species-true faith” for Germany. He left the movement because of its anti-Christian stance.

Works (in English translation)
 "The vampire of the continent", 1916   
(translated by George Chatterton-Hill from the German original titled "Der Vampir des Festlandes; eine Darstellung der englischen Politik nach ihren Triebkräften, mitteln und wirkungen", 1915)
 “Where is God?” “Friends of Europe” publications ; no. 47, London, 1937
 “The Neutrals In This War,” Current History, a journal published by The New York Times, October 1915, p. 169-172.

See also 
 Joseph B. Neville, Jr., “Ernst Reventlow and the Weimar Republic:  A Völkish Radical Confronts Germany’s Social Question," Societas 7, 1977, pp. 229–251.
 Christian Zentner, and Friedemann Bedürftig, “Encyclopedia of the Third Reich,” Da Capo Press, New York City, 1997.
 Conan Fischer, “The German Communists and the Rise of Nazism,” St. Martin's Press, New York City, 1991.

References

External links
Reventlow family genealogy
 
Mary M. Solberg, A Church Undone, page 278

1869 births
1943 deaths
19th-century Danish nobility
20th-century Danish nobility
Nazi Party politicians
German modern pagans
German Völkisch Freedom Party politicians
Imperial German Navy personnel of World War I
National Socialist Freedom Movement politicians
Nazi Party officials
People from Husum
People from the Province of Schleswig-Holstein
Members of the Reichstag of the Weimar Republic
Members of the Reichstag of Nazi Germany
German nationalists
Ernst
National Bolsheviks